Bulanovka is a rural locality (a selo) in Shebekinsky District, Belgorod Oblast, Russia. The population was 673 as of 2010. There are 12 streets.

Geography 
Bulanovka is located 59 km northeast of Shebekino (the district's administrative centre) by road. Popovka is the nearest rural locality.

References 

Rural localities in Shebekinsky District
Novooskolsky Uyezd